The 2015 Campeonato Internacional de Tênis de Campinas was a professional tennis tournament played on clay courts. It was the fifth edition of the tournament which was part of the 2015 ATP Challenger Tour. It took place in Campinas, Brazil between 21 and 27 September 2015.

Singles main-draw entrants

Seeds

 1 Rankings are as of September 16, 2015.

Other entrants
The following players received wildcards into the singles main draw:
  Breno Lodis
  Carlos Eduardo Severino
  Marcelo Zormann
  Orlando Luz

The following players received entry as an alternate:
  Facundo Bagnis

The following players received entry from the qualifying draw:
  Pedro Sakamoto 
  Ricardo Hocevar 
  Tiago Lopes 
  Wilson Leite

Champions

Singles

 Facundo Argüello def.  Diego Schwartzman, 7–5, 6–3.

Doubles

 Andrés Molteni /  Hans Podlipnik def.  Guilherme Clezar /  Fabrício Neis, 3–6, 6–2, [10–0].

External links
Official Website

Tetra Pak Tennis Cup
Tetra Pak Tennis Cup
2015 in Brazilian tennis